Zijemlje is a village and the seat of Istočni Mostar municipality in Republika Srpska, Bosnia and Herzegovina.

References

Populated places in Istočni Mostar